Axel Schulz (born 9 November 1968) is a German former professional boxer who competed from 1990 to 1999, and in 2006. He challenged three times for both the IBF and European heavyweight titles. As an amateur he won a bronze medal at the 1989 World Championships and silver at the 1989 European Championships, both in the heavyweight division.

Schulz first fought for a world championship in 1995, when he challenged George Foreman for his IBF title. Schulz lost a very close majority decision, but was immediately granted a second opportunity at the title in the same year. With Foreman having vacated the title after refusing a rematch, Schulz faced Francois Botha but this time lost via (a controversial) split decision. However, Botha later failed a drug test, which led to Schulz receiving a third chance at the title. In 1996 he fought Michael Moorer for the vacant IBF title, losing again via split decision. During his career, Schulz also fought Jeremy Williams and former world champions Henry Akinwande, James Smith and Wladimir Klitschko.

Amateur career

From 1982 Schulz boxed for the army sports club Vorwärts in Frankfurt (Oder), later becoming the East German youth champion. From 1986 onward, he was a Stasi informer under the codename "Markus". At the junior European championships in Denmark in 1986, Schulz won the light-heavyweight title, and in 1988, under the tutelage of Manfred Wolke, he became East German heavyweight champion. In 1989 he won the Chemiepokal in Halle (Saale), the silver medal at European Championships in Athens, and a bronze medal in the world championships in Moscow, where he lost to Félix Savón.
Amateur record: 78 wins, 20 losses.

Professional career
After reunification, Schulz turned professional. In 1992 he became German heavyweight champion after defeating Bernd Friedrich in Kassel.

1992 and 1993 saw two fights against Henry Akinwande for the European championship. The first fight was declared a draw, but in the return match Schulz suffered his first professional defeat.

IBF heavyweight title challenges

On 22 April 1995 Schulz fought George Foreman for the IBF heavyweight title, losing controversially on points. This was Foreman's first fight since regaining the title from Michael Moorer, and Schulz was viewed at the time as being a weak, unknown opponent. After refusing a rematch, Foreman was stripped of his title and Schulz was given a second opportunity when he fought Francois Botha  for the vacant title on 12 December 1995. Following a split decision verdict in Botha's favour, the result was changed to a no-contest when Botha failed a doping test. A third chance followed for Schulz on 22 June 1996 when he faced Michael Moorer for the still vacant title. Moorer won on points.

Several fights against lower quality opposition followed. These included a stoppage victory over Kevin McBride, who eight years later would defeat a badly faded Mike Tyson. Schulz ended his career after suffering a stoppage at the hands of Wladimir Klitschko on 25 September 1999 for the vacant European championship. Schulz had been thoroughly outclassed. In the end, despite lofty expectations after the George Foreman fight, Schulz was unable to win a title at European or world level.

Comeback attempt
Since the end of his career Schulz has worked in television as a summariser. In December 2005 he received an offer to fight again from Carl King, the stepson of the boxing promoter Don King. His comeback fight took place on November 25, 2006, against Brian Minto. He lost the fight in the sixth Round (T.K.O.).

He retired with a record with 26-5-1 and one no contest with 11 knockouts.

Axel Schulz married in March 2006. He and his wife had their first child, a girl, on 19 August 2006: Paulina Patricia Clara and another girl born in January 2010: Amelina Patricia Hedwig.

Professional boxing record

Television viewership

Germany

Citations

External links 

1968 births
Living people
People from Oder-Spree
People from Bezirk Frankfurt
German male boxers
Heavyweight boxers
Sportspeople from Brandenburg
AIBA World Boxing Championships medalists
People of the Stasi